Khatunabad (also Romanized as Khātūnābād; also known as Khātūnbān) is a village in Nurabad Rural District, in the Central District of Delfan County, Lorestan Province, Iran. At the 2006 census, its population was 114, in 20 families.

References 

Towns and villages in Delfan County